Lamarchea sulcata is a member of the family Myrtaceae endemic to Western Australia and the Northern Territory.

Depending on rainfall it blooms between August and October producing green-red flowers.

It is found on sand dunes, rocky hills and flats in the Pilbara and Goldfields-Esperance regions of Western Australia where it grows in gravelly sandy to loamy soils.

The species was first described in 1972 by the botanist Alex George in the article A revision of the genus Lamarchea Gaudichaud (Myrtaceae: Leptospermoideae) published in the journal Nuytsia.

References

Myrtaceae
Flora of Western Australia
Flora of the Northern Territory
Plants described in 1972